How Chief Te Ponga Won His Bride is a 1913 New Zealand feature film directed and produced  by Gaston Méliès. Principal photography took place in New Zealand. 
He shot three other films in New Zealand in 1912-13: Hinemoa, Loved by a Maori Chieftess and The River Wanganui. Méliès sent his film to the United States for post-production treatment, so it is doubtful if any were shown in New Zealand.

Plot 
The story is set in the Waikatu (Waikato?) where two Māori tribes are at war, with the story of the  love between the young chief Te Ponga and the beautiful daughter Puhuhu, daughter of the rival chief, similar to the legend of Hinemoa and Tutanekai.

Cast 
The film was shot in Whakarewarewa, Rotorua with local Māori as cast. No details of the cast survive, although they are probably the same actors as used in the other two films shot by Méliès at this time.

External links

References
New Zealand Film 1912-1996 by Helen Martin and Sam Edwards p22 (1997, Oxford University Press, Auckland)  

1913 films
1913 in New Zealand
1986 films
1910s historical drama films
Films set in New Zealand
1913 drama films
Films shot in New Zealand
Films directed by Gaston Méliès
Films produced by Gaston Méliès
New Zealand historical drama films
New Zealand silent films
Films about Māori people
1980s English-language films
1910s English-language films
Silent drama films